Anarchism in Greece traces its roots to ancient Greece but was formed as a political movement during the 19th century. It was in the ancient era that the first libertarian thoughts appeared when philosophers based on rationality questioned the fundamentals of tradition. Modern anarchism in Greece emerged in the 19th century, heavily influenced by the contemporary European classical anarchism. Because of the Bolshevik success in the Russian Revolution of 1917 and the rise of the Communist Party, anarchism faded after the first decades of the 20th century. The collapse of the military junta put an end to the monopoly of the political power from the Right, whereas the dissolution of the Soviet Union diminished the allure of the Communist Party of Greece allowing anarchist groups to gain pace in Athens and other cities.

Precursors 

Beliefs, opinions and sentiments that are close to anarchist core values were expressed in Ancient Greece. With the appearance of presocratic thought, rational inquiry during the classical and Hellenistic period, challenged traditional beliefs, religion and authority itself. Socrates skepticism towards the state and its passionate support of the individual's moral freedom were among the first-ever libertarian critiques. Cynics' contribution to philosophical anarchism was the distinction between the man-made laws and nature's law, fiercely rejecting the former. Stoics followed the same worldview and Zeno of Citium, the main stoic philosopher, received the admiration of 19th-century anarchist, Piotr Kropotkin, who was impressed by Zeno's Republic- a community based on egalitarianism and friendly relations. A powerful play resonating with anarchism was Antigone, by Sophocles, where a young woman defies the orders of the Ruler and acts according to her consciousness.

Ottoman era
According to some academics, shortly before and after the end of Ottoman rule in Greece, the socioeconomic relations of the Greek countryside reflected traits of Bakunian collectivism (decentralization and autonomy) creating a future audience for anarchist ideas. Discussing the second half of the 19th century, a source argued that the level of anarchist activity in the Ottoman Empire was comparable to that in Europe. Some of the Greek anarchists were born in the Ottoman Empire, for example Emmanouil Dadaoglou was from Izmir.

According to a study of anarchism in the late Ottoman Empire by Axel Corlu, Greek anarchists were significantly less than their Armenian or Bulgarian counterparts in the Ottoman Empire at the end of the 19th century. Corlu suggests that Greek anarchists were mostly focused in influencing events, struggles and structures in the Greek state rather than the Ottoman Empire.

Early anarchism  

Early anarchism in Greece traces to the mid-19th century and lasted through World War II. Early Greek socialist thought was dominated by anarchism. The most influential anarchist authors in Greek at the time were Bakunin, Andrea Costa, Kropotkin, and Jean Grave; for comparison, Marx and Engels were not translated in Greek until 1893. Individuals having ties with Italy and Italian immigrants imported anarchism to the Greek mainland with the Ionian islands as a midpoint. Geographical proximity to Italy explains why the port town of Patras saw the first organized anarchist group. Patras had organized meeting places, a viable local press and publishing activity.
Various individuals were inspired by the expansion of European classical Anarchism. The first anarchist publication in Greece appeared in September 1861, in the daily newspaper "" (Light), issue 334. In the main article of the paper, titled "Anarchy", part A, the writer, Dimos Papathanasiou, employed classical anti-authoritarian rhetoric, characterized anarchy as the greatest good and claimed that state authorities live at the expense of the people.

The first Greek-organized anarchist group was the Democratic Club of Patras (Δημοκρατικός Σύλλογος Πάτρας). Founded in 1876 and affiliated with the anti-authoritarian Jura Federation of the First International, the Democratic Club helped to create a federated network of similar Greek groups. They also published the first anarchist newspaper in Greece, Greek Democracy (Ελληνική Δημοκρατία). In its declaration of principles, the Democratic Club claimed that "poverty and ignorance are the greatest wounds of the people" and supported the liberation of Greeks in the Ottoman Empire. Emmanouil Dadaoglou and the Italian Amilcare Cipriani were involved in the club's founding, having previously participated with other anarchists in the 1862 Athens uprising, though details of Dadaoglou's life are unverified.

In 1876, an anarchist working club was founded in Syros. It played an instrumental role in the tannery and shipyard strikes of 1879.

In Lavrion mines, the influence of anarchist and socialist politicized foreign workers (mostly from Italy and Spain) played a vital role in a series of anarcho-syndicalist leaning strikes in the mines during the late 19th century with the most famous of which happening in 1896 and resulting in several casualties both among the workers and the mining company's guards.

Pyrgos, a Peloponnese city close to Patras, was another place that anarchist ideas flourished along with other socialist currents. The fight against loan sharks and the heavy taxation by the state fueled anarchist thought among small raisin producers in the Peloponnese which was the home of various anarchist groups in the late 19th century. New Light (Νέον Φως) was a western Peloponnese weekly newspaper that voiced anarchist ideas (local and international). It was first published in October 1898 by the lawyer Vasileios Theodoridis. Its aim was to unify the subversive people of the Western Peloponnese to face the social problem. The newspaper contained articles of Drakoulis, translations of the works of Pavlos Argyriadis, republications of texts that first appeared in Athenian magazines and news about the Greek and the international labor movement. It also contained adages of the Orthodox Church Fathers and Charles Fourier as well as translations of texts by Bakunin, Kropotkin and Girard.   

The anarchist groups of the Peloponnese were the strongest in Greece until the early 20th century. They had a lively propaganda work in the cities and their surroundings as opposed to "authoritarian" socialists who were more interested in parliamentary politics. They encouraged abstention in the elections of 1899 and mobilized against loan sharks and taxation in the name of raisin producers. They did not seek the support of the state to confront the currant crisis but they denounced instead state mechanisms of oppression.

Zestful socialist Stavros Kallergis was arguing in The Socialist (a newspaper he was editing) that socialism is the path towards Anarchism. The Socialist was funneling the contemporary socialist thought of Europe, ranging from moderate socialist to anarchist opinions, during the 1890s.

Persecution against anarchists intensified in the summer of 1894. The assassination of Sadi Carnot by an anarchist led to a barrage of attacks against the anarchists by the press, and in particular by Asty, the official organ of Charilaos Trikoupis' party. Many anarchists and socialists were put on trial and this led others to either flee the country or relocate in isolated parts of Greece. Similarly, many radical publications closed down and mainstream activity was reduced.

In 1896 in Patras, Dimitrios Matsalis, a sandal maker, murdered Dionysios Fragkopoulos, a banker and currant merchant and injured Andreas Kollas. He declared that "I acted alone. By killing I did not aim at people but I stroke the capital. I am an anarchist and as an anarchist I am in favor of violence." He committed suicide in prison. Fragkopoulos' assassination arguably intensified the erosion of collective identities as the persecutions continued.

Persecuted anarchists and anarcho-syndicalists fled from Patras during the last years of the 19th century. The persecution began right after the International Conference of Rome for the Social Defense Against Anarchists, leading many anarcho-syndicalists that moved to Athens to establish the "Anarchist Workers Association" (Αναρχικός 'Εργατικός Σύνδεσμος). They took part in the anarchist international congress held in Paris in 1900. "Epi ta Proso" (Επί τα πρόσω) was another group of anarchist intellectuals publicly advocating for anarchism in the Peloponnese that finally ended up in Athens before being dissolved.

As in the rest of Europe by that time, propaganda of the deed was employed by the Boatmen of Thessaloniki, a group of Bulgarian anarchists based in Salonica (then part of the Ottoman Empire), and Alexandros Schinas, who assassinated King George I in 1913 for reasons of either anarchist conviction or mental illness. 

In 1916, the anarcho-syndicalist Konstantinos Speras was an organizer of a miners strike in the island of Serifos. The strike was violently faced by the police leading to the death of four workers and wounding others. The workers, supported by their wives, responded by throwing stones killing three of the police and routing the others away. However, even though the strike was organized by an anarchist and the workers took control of government buildings (telegraph tower, police headquarters, town hall), the strikers raised a French flag and asked for protection from the French fleet, which at the time had some ships stationed in the neighboring island of Milos. The strike and the aftermath resulted in the improvement of working conditions in the mines and the first application of the 8-hour working day in modern Greece. 

The anarcho-syndicalist current was present, but a minority, in the first years of the General Confederation of Greek Workers (GSEE) with anarchists such as Konstantinos Speras, Stavros Kouchtsoglou and Yannis Fanourakis trying to keep the confederation out of the politics scope and only to the trade union field. 

The Greek anarchist movement's momentum subsided in the 1920s as, among many factors, the Greek working class turned to Marxist ideology and the Communist Party of Greece, known for its hostility towards anarchists, appeared. Anarchists were expelled from GSEE. Reflecting Greek desire for a strong state, anarchism was eradicated in the 1930s and 1940s, between the Metaxas Regime, the Axis occupation of Greece, and the Greek Civil War. In times of changing government, Greeks relied on local government for resistance and security.

An important figure is Plotino Rhodakanaty, born in 1828. His birthplace is disputed, some authors cite Athens, others cite other European capitals. Nevertheless, he is considered one of the most important figures in Mexican socialist thought.

The Polytechnic uprising and the subcultural movement 

The new phase of the Greek anarchist movement started during the Greek military junta of 1967–1974. In this period, Greek anarchism broke away from its anarcho-syndicalist origins, and it was organized around small direct action groups. Students played a significant role in this new phase. Students returning from Paris, where they had taken part in the events of May 1968 and got in touch with leftist and anarchist ideas, started spreading these ideas among the radical youth. In 1972, Guy Debord's The Society of the Spectacle was published in Athens, along with other Situationist texts. Mikhail Bakunin's God and the State and Peter Kropotkin's Law and Authority followed. In 1971, "Diethnis Vivliothiki" ("International Library"), a publishing and political team was founded. Christos Konstantinides was one of the founding figures and translators such as Agis Stinas contributed. The "Black Rose" bookshop carried these publications of "Diethnis Vivliothiki" ("International Library").

Interest in anarchism swelled with the anti-junta movement, and the 1973 Athens Polytechnic uprising was a flash-point for the junta's opposition. The group that initiated the Polytechnic uprising included a minority of anarchists and leftists. The moderator of the anarchist group was Christos Konstantinides. Anarchists were branded as provocateurs by the Communist Youth of Greece as they were expressing slogans not directly related to the student's demands (i.e. they were calling for sexual freedom, social revolution and the abolition of the State). The resonance with the French 1968 movement was clear. Some demonstrators also used slogans with anarchist overtones, such as "Down with Authority" and "People Revolt". The uprising is commemorated annually with a multi-day march, anarchists often use the occasion to denounce the political regime of the day. The annual protests promote a subculture that sees resistance of authority as one's duty.

On 4 May 1976, the first autonomous anarchist rally took place at Propylaea. The aim was to express political and pacifist messages, while the country was facing severe issues with its neighbor country, Turkey. Some major slogans of the demonstration were «Turkish workers are our brothers» and «The Aegean sea belongs to its fish».

Greek anarchism remained a small subculture after the fall of the junta, but grew into a movement following riots in 1981. In December 1979, protests took place as the Konstantinos Karamanlis Government voted the statutory act no. 815, which aimed to reduce the university exam periods and set a time limit to the study period. The university occupation movement of 1979–1981 was largely instigated by Anarchist and leftist groups. Near the Polytechnic, the student neighborhood of Exarcheia became a "free zone", where leftists, Anarchists, hippies, and others were in charge. Throughout the late 20th century, Greek radical leftists referred to their cause by various fashionable names (autonomous, anti-authority, alternative) while police and the public generally labeled all revolutionary leftists as "anarchists".

On 17 November 1980, a large student demonstration took place in order to commemorate the abolishment of Greek junta. Severe street fights occurred and two protesters were killed. In 1981, when PASOK (The PanHellenic Socialist Movement) came to power, there was a decline of the extra parliamentary left. A big moment for the anarchist movement that helped attest self-confidence was the anarchist demonstration on the hotel "Caravel" hosting a far-right conference (among the participants was Jean-Marie Le Pen of Action Française). The meeting was disrupted and it was then obvious to the intellectuals of the Greek left that confrontational tactics and street fighting had become a trademark of a new major social movement.

Demonstrations and clashes between anarchists and police took place almost daily in Athens between 1985 and 1986. The confrontation between the police and anarchists escalated during the 1985 Polytechnic uprising anniversary demonstration when a group of anarchists set a riot police car on fire. One of the riot policemen, Athanassios Melistas, shot a 15-year-old anarchist, Michalis Kaltezas, in the back of the head, killing him instantly and sparking large riots in Athens and Thessaloniki and the occupation of the University of Athens's Chemistry Department. Police forces entered the university the next morning after receiving permission from the Commission of University Asylum, whose president was dean Michalis Stathopoulos. There was a heavy use of tear gas sprays and a brutal arrest of 37 people. The anarchist movement staged demonstrations with thousands of participants in Athens. In retaliation against Melistas, the Marxist-Leninist Revolutionary Organization 17 November killed Nikolaos Georgakopoulos and injured fourteen other MAT (riot police) officers in a 1985 bus bombing.

The anarchists proposals were in contrast to the legalistic approach of the Greek Communist Party which at the time was enjoying parliamentary participation, with Exarcheia was increasingly perceived as becoming a no-go zone for police as clashes occurred merely with the sight of officers.

Alternative media and punk subcultures proliferated anarchist thought among Greek youth in the 1980s and 1990s. This collectively owned media spread messages against neoliberalism, reactionary populism, liberal democracy, and the state. By the late 1980s, anarchism had turned towards a broader spectrum of issues: gender inequalities, patriarchy, racism towards immigrants, and ethnic minority repression (Slavic and Turkish). Anarchist squats emerged in this era, among which Villa Amalia and Villa Lela Karagianni were the most prominent.

Contemporary 

The collapse of the USSR had a profound impact not only on anarchism but on Greece as well. Greek anarchism reached a peak of activity between 1989 and 1995, reinforced by a disappointment with Greek mainstream politics. The 1990-93 Mitsotakis government agenda included an attempt to enforce neoliberal policies. The 1990s was the era that the anti-authoritarian movement became more prominent and had active participation among student riots against government plans for the privatization of the education sector. The most circulated publications of the era were The Void Network and The Children of the Gallery.

In the new millennium, with capitalism and neoliberalism being viewed as advancing throughout the world, Greek anarchists participated in the anti-globalization movement. New collectives, such as the Antieksousiastiki kinisi in Exarcheia and its associated newspaper, Babylonia, became popular among rebellious youth. Athens Indymedia and Antieksousiastiki kinisi were formed in 2001 and 2003 respectively.

On 6 December 2008, the lethal shooting of 15-year-old Alexandros Grigoropoulos by a policeman in Exarcheia District in Athens, generated an immediate social unrest that quickly escalated into large-scale riots. The significant repercussions that followed were the most intense to occur in Greece since the fall of the military dictatorship. Within a short period of time, anarchists, leftists, and sympathizers rioted and attacked banks, police vehicles and government offices in the area. It was the first time that these groups displayed such meticulous discipline, hierarchy and coordination. The fact that the murder of Alexandros occurred in the Exarcheia District was of major symbolic significance, as police presence in the area was considered to be an intrusion to a "ground occupied by the antagonistic movement" and was felt by some as an attack against the anarchist movement.

The Greek Government of the time (Prime Minister; Konstantinos A. Karamanlis) chose to have a 'defensive' approach on the events that were taking place. The aim was to avoid further civil disorder and instances of potential violence. Other political parties tried to take advantage of the situation and organized nine demonstrations in three days.

The parliament building was besieged for weeks by angry crowds. For a month, large protests were taking place in many major Greek cities, with a lot of them resulting in conflict with the police and arson attacks on government buildings, shops and banks. On multiple occasions during the attacks, the violence against the police resulted in officers getting shot and/or severely wounded. An anarchist form of illegalism re-emerged during the insurrection when anarchist expropriated food from stores to distribute to people in need. Athens Indymedia, an open publishing, anti-authoritarian site which attracted significant audience during the 2008 revolt, paralleled the expansion of the anarchist choros within the Greek society.

The rebellion that took place in 2008 was fueled, in part, by the prevailing economic insecurity. Anarchist groups organized and participated in protests against the austerity measures implemented by the government to resolve the economic crisis that was precipitated by the sovereign debt crisis. Certain anarchist groups and networks, in conjunction with activists affiliated to anarchist and libertarian ideas, during the beginning of the crisis, differentiated themselves from violence, becoming engaged in self-organization activities Spontaneous networks of students and other radicals were formed that followed an anarchistic approach on how they function. The influence of traditional Marxism was minimal. 

In May 2010, a significant wave of protest occurred when the Greek parliament voted on its first austerity memorandum. During the protest, a petrol bomb was fired at the Marfin Bank in Stadiou Street and caused the deaths of three bank employees. After this tragic event, there was a notable drop in the attendance and frequency of protests and more importantly the "ideological legitimacy", and anarchist momentum eased. However, no evidence about the perpetrator being an anarchist was provided, and the accused anarchist was declared innocent in the court. There are also several anarchist groups that have been vocal about disagreeing and condemning the use of violence as a practice at Marfin and other such instances.

In 2013, there were several protests when anarchist Nikos Romanos was arrested for bank robbery and the police digitally altered his mug shot in order to cover several bruises that were inflicted during his arrest. Amnesty International described this as a "culture of abuse and impunity in the Greek police".

As of 2013, anarchist groups that have claimed responsibility for recent violent attacks include the Lovers of Lawlessness, Wild Freedom and Instigators of Social Explosion, Gangs of Consciousness, Lonely Wolf, the Untouchable Cell of Revenge and most recently, Untamed Desires.

As of 2017 Interpol claims Greece was one of the only three European Union countries (along with Italy and Spain) that appear to be dealing with anarchist terrorism.

List of groups and places 

Chóros, meaning "scene" or "milieu" in Greek, is the body of loosely associated anarchist groups and collectives in Greece.

Groups
Anarchist Federation, a platformist federation
Anarchist Political Organisation (Anarchikí Politikí Orgánosi), a synthesis federation affiliated with the International of Anarchist Federations
Anarcho-syndicalist Initiative Rocinante (Anarchosyndikalistikís Protovoulías – Rosinánte), an anarcho-syndicalist federation
Anti-authoritarian Current (AK) (Antiexousiastikí Kínisi), anti-authoritarian group in Athens
Conspiracy of Fire Nuclei (Synomosía ton Pyrínon tis Fotiás), an individualist anarchist militant organization
Industrial Workers of the World, a grassroots trade union affiliated with the International Confederation of Labor
Libertarian Syndicalist Union (Eleftheriakí Syndikalistikí Énosi), an anarcho-syndicalist group affiliated with the International Confederation of Labor
Revolutionary Struggle (Epanastatikos Agonas), a platformist militant group
Rouvikonas, anarchist collective operating out of Exarcheia, part of the Anarchist Federation
Squats and other places

Exarcheia
Lela Karagianni, historic center in Athens named after Lela Karagianni
Villa Amalia, Anarchist squat used for cultural events, now evicted

Publications
Diadromi Eleftherias
Babylonia, newspaper affiliated to Anti-authoritarian Current 
Rocinante, anarcho-syndicalist publication
Apatris, anarchist newspaper

Radio Stations
Radiozones Anatreptikis Ekfrasis
Elefthero Koinoniko Radiofono 1431AM

See also 

 Christoforos Marinos

References

Sources

Further reading

 Revolt and Crisis in Greece. AK Press & Occupied London (2011).

 

 
Greece